The Old Rowan County Courthouse, located on Main Street in Morehead, Kentucky, was built in 1899. Since the early 21st century, it is used as the home of the Rowan County Arts Center.  It is a two-story brick building on a rusticated limestone foundation.

The courthouse was listed on the National Register of Historic Places in 1983.  The listing was expanded by a boundary increase approved March 13, 2017.   Additional documentation was also approved on that date.

It is also a contributing building in the 2022-designated Downtown Morehead Historic District.

References

Courthouses on the National Register of Historic Places in Kentucky
Government buildings completed in 1899
National Register of Historic Places in Rowan County, Kentucky
County courthouses in Kentucky
Individually listed contributing properties to historic districts on the National Register in Kentucky
1899 establishments in Kentucky
Arts centers in Kentucky